Yves Modéran (1955 – 1 July 2010, Paris) was a French historian, a professor of Roman history at the University of Caen Normandy.

Agrégé d'histoire in 1978, he was a specialist of North Africa during Antiquity and later, in particular of the Vandals period. He took part to the excavations at Bulla Regia as part of studies organized by the École française de Rome.

Works (partial list) 
1987: "Qui montana Gurubi colunt". Corrippe et le mythe des Maures du cap Bon, MEFRA, volume 99, n°99-2, (pp. 963-989) Read online 
1989: Gildon, les Maures et l'Afrique romaine, MEFRA, volume 101, n°101-2, (pp. 821-872) Read online 
1993: La chronologie de la Vie de saint Fulgence de Ruspe et ses incidences sur l'histoire de l'Afrique vandale, MEFRA, volume 105, n°105-1, (pp. 135-188) Read online 
2003: Les Maures et l'Afrique romaine, IVe–VIIe., ed. Bibliothèque des Ecoles françaises d'Athènes et de Rome
2003: L'Empire romain tardif (235-395), éd. Ellipses Marketing, Paris, 
2014: Les Vandales et l'Empire romain, (with Michel-Yves Perrin) éd. Errance - Actes Sud,

References

External links 
 Publications d'Yves Modéran d'après le site du CRAHAM 
 Publications de Yves Modéran (Bibliographie du Maghreb antique et médiéval)
 Yves Modéran, La conversion de Constantin et la christianisation de l’Empire romain, APHG Caen, juin 2001
 Les Vandales, "le plus délicat des peuples" L'Histoire n° 327 - 12/2007
 Hommage de Jehan Desanges à Yves Modéran on the site of the Encyclopédie berbère

20th-century French historians
21st-century French historians
French scholars of Roman history
Academic staff of the University of Caen Normandy
1955 births
2010 deaths